In Bangladesh, a medical school is known as a medical college. Allopathic and Alternative Medicine related medical education  at the graduate level are provided by medical colleges. The colleges are under the jurisdiction of the Ministry of Health and Family Welfare (MoHFW), and are affiliated with a university in the respective region. They however have to be recognized after meeting a set criterion by a central regulatory authority called Bangladesh Medical and Dental Council (BM&DC).

Until 1986, all medical colleges were established by the government. Since then, several private medical colleges have been set up. At present, there are total 112 recognized medical colleges in Bangladesh, 37 of which are public and 70 private. Apart from these, six medical colleges are run by the Bangladesh Armed Forces and are under the Ministry of Defence. As of 2021, government medical colleges offer 4350 seats for MBBS students, private medical colleges offer about 6040 seats, and army controlled medical colleges offer about 375 seats.

All the medical colleges award the Bachelor of Medicine, Bachelor of Surgery (MBBS). The Doctor of Medicine (MD) or Master of Surgery (MS) is awarded as a postgraduate research degree in selected medical colleges and universities, following the medical tradition of Commonwealth countries. As per the declaration of overseas registration of the General Medical Council, the awarded MBBS degree from some of the institutions is eligible to apply for registration in the United Kingdom.

Public

Private

Military

Public medical universities
 Bangabandhu Sheikh Mujib Medical University Dhaka 
 Chittagong Medical University
 Rajshahi Medical University
 Sylhet Medical University
 Sheikh Hasina Medical University, Khulna

See also
 List of dental schools in Bangladesh
 Bangladesh Medical and Dental Council

References

External links
 List Of Affiliated Medical & Dental Colleges with University of Dhaka

 Affiliated Colleges & Institutions with University of Rajshahi 

Affiliated Colleges with University of Chittagong

DGHS Approved Public & Private Medical & Dental College List

BM&DC Approved Medical & Dental College

 
Medical College
Bangladesh